Nardole is a fictional character created by Steven Moffat and portrayed by Matt Lucas in the long-running British science fiction television series Doctor Who. He is a companion of the Twelfth Doctor, an incarnation of the alien time traveller known as The Doctor, played by Peter Capaldi. Nardole initially appeared in the 2015 Christmas special "The Husbands of River Song", as a companion of River Song, before returning in the following episode "The Return of Doctor Mysterio", having become the Doctor's companion in the meantime.

Nardole is an humanoid extraterrestrial being from the 54th century with cybernetic implants, belonging to a humanoid colony on the planet Mendorax Dellora. He is the first full-time alien companion of the revived series and the first in the series in over 30 years. Unlike most companions, and in spite of his considerable skills as a reformed career criminal, Nardole rarely wishes to travel with the Doctor, instead staying safe on Earth in most episodes. Nevertheless, he sometimes gets involved in the Doctor's adventures, mostly against his will.

Appearances 
Nardole is introduced in the 2015 Christmas special, "The Husbands of River Song", as the employee of the Doctor's wife, River Song (Alex Kingston). In the course of the episode, he is decapitated, with his head ending up as part of a cyborg body. In the subsequent Christmas episode, "The Return of Doctor Mysterio" (2016), Nardole appears again as the Doctor's companion.  The Doctor had rebuilt Nardole's original body, but it is unclear whether Nardole is now a cyborg or purely organic.

For the tenth series, which follows the two specials, Nardole remains the Doctor's assistant. When the series begins, with "The Pilot" (2017), the pair were based in a university in Bristol, where Nardole attempted to keep the Doctor to his oath to guard an alien vault beneath the university. He is concerned about the Doctor taking on Bill Potts (Pearl Mackie) as a new travelling companion, maintaining that it amounts to him abandoning his post. Nardole is ultimately dragged on an outer space adventure with the Doctor and Bill in "Oxygen". The subsequent episodes of "Extremis", "The Pyramid at the End of the World" and "The Lie of the Land", following a story arc over the three episodes, establish that Nardole came to assist the Doctor on instructions left by River Song before she died, and he has taken it as his mission to keep the Doctor in line as the last request of River Song, to the point that he refers to himself as "the only person legally qualified to kick the Doctor's arse". He formally joined the Doctor after the Doctor took an oath to guard his Time Lord friend and arch-enemy Missy (Michelle Gomez) for a thousand years. In the same story, Nardole narrowly escapes a deadly bacterial infection due to his alien biology, and he assists Bill and the Doctor in restoring free will to the Earth after history had been rewritten by the menacing alien "Monks". 

In several following episodes, Nardole repeatedly shows his resourcefulness and adaptability as he joins the Doctor and Bill on other trips, even once working with Missy to repair the TARDIS after it returns to Earth with Nardole inside it while leaving the Doctor and Bill on Mars in the Victorian era ("Empress of Mars"). In the series finale, "World Enough and Time"/"The Doctor Falls", the Doctor's crew and Missy react to a distress call on board a Mondasian ship, which results in Bill being shot through the heart and converted into a Cyberman,  due to the machinations of Missy's past incarnation, the Master (John Simm). They escape the immediate clutches of the Cybermen due to Nardole commandeering a shuttle, which he pilots into higher levels of the colony ship. The ship is so large that several simulated countrysides exist within as solar farms, with dozens of villagers. In battle with the Cybermen, Nardole repeatedly proves his computer and combat talents, rigging powerful explosions throughout the countryside. When the Doctor realises that to defeat the Cybermen he must destroy a whole level of the ship, he instructs Nardole to take the villagers to safety on another floor. Nardole does so, unsure if he will ever see the Doctor again and knowing that the Cybermen will one day return to convert the human population. Lucas reprises the role briefly in "Twice Upon a Time", playing an avatar of Nardole made from Nardole's memories at the time of his death. He hugs the Doctor and wishes him farewell before his pending regeneration. In Paul Cornell’s novelisation of the story, it is revealed that the Cybermen stopped being a threat not long after the Doctor left and Nardole lived to an old age with several wives and children.

Casting and development
In November 2015, it was announced that Matt Lucas would appear in "The Husbands of River Song" as a guest character named Nardole. On 14 June 2016, it was confirmed that Nardole would return in the 2016 Christmas special, "The Return of Doctor Mysterio", as the Doctor's companion and stay in this role in the tenth series until the finale. Steven Moffat said that Matt Lucas wanted to play Nardole again and so he used the chance to bring Lucas back as a regular.

References

External links
 Nardole on BBC Doctor Who website
 Nardole on BBC Worldwide Doctor Who website
 

Doctor Who aliens
Doctor Who companions
Fictional amputees
Fictional cyborgs
Male characters in television
Television characters introduced in 2015